Burr Oak is a commuter rail station along the Blue Island Branch of the Metra Electric line in Calumet Park, Illinois. It borders the City of Blue Island.

Parking is available behind the station on the southeast corner of Burr Oak Avenue and Winchester Street. One Pace bus connection is available at the station.

Bus connections
Pace
 359 Robbins/South Kedzie Avenue

References

External links

Station from Burr Oak Avenue (127th Street) from Google Maps Street View
Station from Winchester Avenue from Google Maps Street View

Metra stations in Illinois
Blue Island, Illinois
Railway stations in Cook County, Illinois